The Deseret alphabet (Deseret:  or ) is a phonemic English-language spelling reform developed between 1847 and 1854 by the board of regents of the University of Deseret under the leadership of Brigham Young, the second president of the Church of Jesus Christ of Latter-day Saints (LDS Church). George D. Watt is reported to have been the most actively involved in the development of the script, as well as being its first serious user.

In public statements, Young claimed the alphabet was intended to replace the traditional Latin alphabet with an alternative, more phonetically accurate alphabet for the English language. This would offer immigrants an opportunity to learn to read and write English, he said, the orthography of which is often less phonetically consistent than those of many other languages. Similar neographies have been attempted, the most well-known of which for English is the Shavian alphabet.

The Deseret alphabet was an outgrowth of Young's, and the early LDS Church's, idealism and utopianism. Young and the Mormon pioneers believed "all aspects of life" were in need of reform, and the Deseret alphabet was just one of many ways they sought to bring about a complete "transformation in society".

Young also prescribed the learning of Deseret to the school system, stating "It will be the means of introducing uniformity in our orthography, and the years that are now required to learn to read and spell can be devoted to other studies."

During the alphabet's heyday between 1854 and 1869, books, newspapers, street signs and correspondence used the new letters, but despite heavy and costly promotion by the early LDS Church, the alphabet never enjoyed prolonged widespread use and has been regarded by historians as a failure.

History

Creation (1847–1854) 
The Deseret alphabet was a project of the Mormon pioneers, a group of early followers of the Church of Jesus Christ of Latter-day Saints (LDS Church) which set about building a new society in the Utah desert after the death of the church's founder, Joseph Smith. The Deseret alphabet was just one of many ways that the Mormon pioneers tried to bring about a complete "transformation in society", as an outgrowth of their idealism and utopianism.

The Deseret alphabet was developed primarily by a committee made up of the board of regents of the University of Deseret, members of which included church leaders Brigham Young, Parley P. Pratt and Heber C. Kimball. According to Brigham Young University professor Richard G. Moore, most scholars believe that George D. Watt's contribution to the actual form the alphabet took was the greatest; he furthermore "plant[ed] the idea of spelling reform in Brigham Young's mind" through a phonography class he gave after the death of Joseph Smith which Young attended. William W. Phelps helped "work out the letters" along with Pratt.   Before they decided on the Deseret alphabet, the attention of the board of regents was mostly focused on Pitman style alphabets, and in April 1847 Brigham Young nearly purchased  of lead type to print books using Pitman's orthography. The University of Deseret was incorporated on 28 February 1850; less than three weeks later, on 20 March, the new board of regents began to discuss spelling reform.

On 29 November 1853, the committee was ready to approve a slightly modified version of the Pitman orthography, when Willard Richards, who had been deathly ill and missed the debate before the vote, saw the proposed alphabet, which spelled the word "phonetic" as "fɷnetic". Richards was quick to condemn it, saying to the committee that in his view "those characters...seem like putting old wine into new bottles...I am inclined to think...we shall...throw away all characters that bear much resemblance to the English characters, and introduce an alphabet that is original."

These words persuaded Brigham Young and the rest of the committee, and Watt then endeavored to create an original alphabet. Less than two months later, on 19 January 1854, the board of regents finally approved the first 38-letter Deseret alphabet. One legacy of Pitman's orthography survived, though: the idea that one letter should equal one sound.

Use by the Mormon pioneers (1854–1869) 
Upon the alphabet's acceptance, its first user was its principal architect, George D. Watt, who began writing the meeting minutes of the early Bishops in a cursive form of it in 1854. Almost immediately after its publication, church members began experimenting with it, and by 1855 travel writers Jules Remy and Julius Brenchley published a chart of the new alphabet which differed heavily from the 1854 version. Some early Mormons, such as Thales Hastings Haskell, began writing their personal journals in the new alphabet. Remy further reported that during his time in Salt Lake City, he saw signs on the street and above shops using the new alphabet.

After its approval by the board of regents, Brigham Young testified before the Utah territorial legislature that the new alphabet should "be thoroughly and extensively taught in all the schools." Some teaching in Utah schools did take place: John B. Milner taught the alphabet in Provo, Lehi, American Fork, and Pleasant Grove, while evening classes were taught in Salt Lake City and Farmington.

After several months' practice writing with the new alphabet, Watt wrote to Brigham Young that he was unhappy with it, and proposed a complete overhaul, which was never followed up on.

Word of the new alphabet soon spread outside Utah, and most press reports in non-Mormon papers were critical. Other writers, however, acquainted with other phonotypic and stenographic alphabets, ranged from neutral descriptions of the new alphabet to praise.

Until this point, all the printed material (mostly just charts of the alphabet and its standard orthography equivalents) had been produced with large wooden type, which was not suitable for printing at small sizes. Because the alphabet was wholly unique, no font existed, so in 1857 the board of regents appointed Erastus Snow to procure metal type from St. Louis-based font foundry Ladew & Peer. However, in May 1857 the Utah War began, and Snow left St. Louis to support the Mormon pioneers. During the war, Ladew & Peer kept working on the type, and the punches and matrices were delivered in the winter of 1858. The first use of the new type was to make a business card for George A. Smith, an early Mormon historian.

In 1859, with the new type in hand, the Deseret News began printing with it. It would print one piece per issue in the new alphabet, usually a quotation from The Book of Mormon or the New Testament. However, this only lasted for one year, after which the practice stopped; it would start again in May 1864 and stop permanently at the end of that year.Benn Pitman, the brother of Isaac Pitman, was also interested in spelling reform, and by 1864 had published his own orthography, which the board of regents considered adopting. However, they ultimately decided not to and used the opportunity to re-affirm their commitment to the Deseret alphabet.

Brigham Young blamed the failure of this first attempt at reform on the ugliness of the type developed by Ladew & Peer, and so he commissioned Russell's American Steam Printing House, a New York City based font foundry, to design more pleasing type. The result was the Bodoni-esque font (at right) that was used to print all of the books in this period. In an 1868 article, the Deseret News wrote that "the characters, to a person unaccustomed to them, may look strange, [but] to the eye to which they are familiar they are beautiful."

At least four books were published in the new alphabet, all transcribed by Orson Pratt and all using the Russell's House font: The First Deseret Alphabet Reader (1868), The Second Deseret Alphabet Reader (1868), The Book of Mormon (1869), and a Book of Mormon excerpt called First Nephi–Omni (1869).

Considerable non-printed material in the Deseret alphabet was made, including a replica headstone in Cedar City, Utah, some coinage, letters, diaries, and meeting minutes. One of the more curious items found in the Deseret alphabet is an English-Hopi dictionary prepared by two Mormon missionaries. The handwritten document sat in the LDS Church Archives, largely ignored until 2014 when writing system researcher and computer scientist Kenneth R. Beesley re-discovered it and transcribed it into standard written English.

Decline (1869–1877) 

Despite years of heavy promotion, the Deseret alphabet was never widely adopted. This reluctance was partly due to prohibitive costs; the project had already cost the early church $20,000, with $6,000 going to Pratt as remuneration for his transcription effort and most of the rest going to cutting metal type featuring the new alphabet and printing costs. In 1859, Orson Pratt estimated that the cost of supplying all Utah Territory schoolchildren with suitable textbooks would be over $5,000,000.

According to Beesley, many have written that interest in the Deseret alphabet died with Brigham Young. This, however, is not true; the alphabet was already regarded as a failure during Young's time. Only 500 copies of the full Book of Mormon translated into the Deseret alphabet sold for $2 each, and even Young realized that the venture was too expensive and even the most devout Mormons could not be convinced to purchase and study the Deseret edition books over the books in the traditional orthography. In the winter of 1870, just one year after their publication, advertisements for the Deseret alphabet books were quietly removed from the Deseret News.

Contemporary writers noted that thousands of copies of the 15¢ and 20¢ Deseret primers went unsold, and historian Roby Wentz speculated that the LDS Church at that time had a "cache" of the primers in mint condition, which it was slowly selling off; according to him, one such primer sold for $250 in 1978.

The Mormons had planned to use the profits from sale of the earlier books to fund printing of more books, and in anticipation Orson Pratt had already transcribed the complete Bible, Doctrine and Covenants, and John Jaques's Catechism for Children. Pratt had also prepared an apparent sequel to the primers, the Deseret Phonetic Speller. After the sales failure, however, none of these books were ever published and were thought lost until being rediscovered in a storage area of the LDS Church Archives in Salt Lake City in May 1967.

Ralph Vigoda, a reporter for The Philadelphia Inquirer, has speculated that the completion of the Transcontinental Railroad may have contributed to the alphabet's downfall: non-Mormons, not loyal to Brigham Young, became a large part of the city, and without the religious motivation it would be difficult indeed to get them to learn a new alphabet. In a retrospective piece, historian A. J. Simmonds claims that the new railroad doomed the alphabet. According to him, easy access to "the whole literature of the English speaking world" rendered the alphabet useless.

In July 1877, Young tried one more time at a spelling reform, ordering lead type designed for the orthography of Benn Pitman (Isaac's brother) with the intention of printing an edition of the Book of Mormon and Doctrine and Covenants using it. Most of the type had arrived by August, but with Young's death, the translation was never undertaken and the type never used. Young's death thus marked the end of the Mormon experimentation with English spelling reforms.

Rediscovery in the computer era 

Modern digital typography has reduced the costs of typesetting substantially, especially for small print runs. As long as a freely licensed Deseret alphabet font and a font of the standard orthography have similar inked surface areas, printing a book in the Deseret alphabet using modern technology would have a similar cost as printing a book in the standard orthography.

Film director Trent Harris used the Deseret alphabet in his 1994 satire of Mormon theology, Plan 10 from Outer Space, where it features as an alien language used on a mysterious "Plaque of Kolob".

During the 1996 Utah Centennial celebration, an activity book for children was distributed, within which one of the activities was for a child to write their own name in the alphabet. The book says that a child who does this will be "the first kid in 100 years to write [their] name in the Deseret alphabet!"

Also in 1996, Buffalo River Press published a reprint of the Deseret First Book, of which only 10,000 were originally printed. The entire Book of Mormon in the Deseret alphabet has been likewise reprinted, as only 500 copies from the original print run exist, and they can sell on eBay for ≈$7,500 (as of 2004). In 1997, John Jenkins uploaded a free three part PDF of the so-called "triple combination", that is, a combined Book of Mormon, Doctrine and Covenants and Pearl of Great Price.

John Jenkins has gone on to publish many classic pieces of English literature in the Deseret alphabet, such as Alice in Wonderland, Pride and Prejudice, and The Wonderful Wizard of Oz.

Owing to the character set's inclusion in Unicode, most of the original books and many of the original manuscripts have been transcribed into plain text, and, when this is not possible due to discrepancies between the Unicode reference glyphs and the documents, LaTeX.

Fonts 
 The first digital font for the Deseret alphabet, called "Deseret", was designed by Greg Kearney as part of work he was doing for the LDS Church History Department in 1991; the font was used in an exhibit that year. In August 1995, a cleaned up, digitized version of the font in use in the Deseret Second Book was created by Salt Lake City graphic designer Edward Bateman, who made the font in Fontographer while working on Plan 10 from Outer Space.

Kenneth R. Beesley created a Metafont (and thus, LaTeX-compatible) font called  in 2002.

All computers running Microsoft's Windows 7 operating system or newer can display the entire Deseret alphabet Unicode range as the glyphs are included in the Segoe UI Symbol font.

Besides maintaining a Deseret input method for Windows, Joshua Erickson, a UCLA alumnus, also maintains a large collection of freeware Unicode fonts for the alphabet, which he collectively terms the "Bee Fonts."

There also exist free software fonts for the Deseret alphabet. Google, through its Noto Sans project, the aim of which is "to support all languages with a harmonious look and feel", has also released a Deseret font under the name "Noto Sans Deseret". George Douros maintains a public domain font called "Analecta" as part of his Unicode Fonts for Ancient Scripts project, which supports the Coptic, Gothic, and Deseret scripts. Deseret glyphs are also available in the popular pan-Unicode fonts Code2001 and Everson Mono (as of version 5.1.5).

Alphabet
Although the Deseret alphabet has letter case, usually the only difference between the minuscule and majuscule forms is that the majuscule forms are larger.

A degree of free spelling is allowed to accommodate dialectal differences in English. For example, in the Deseret edition of The Book of Mormon, the word "wherefore" is written as 𐐸𐐶𐐯𐑉𐑁𐐬𐑉, which means that the translator of the book did not exhibit the wine–whine merger. Those who do exhibit the merger might instead prefer the spelling 𐐶𐐯𐑉𐑁𐐬𐑉 to match the pronunciation, or, depending on dialect, perhaps 𐐶𐐯𐑉𐑁𐐫𐑉.

The alphabet was designed to be able to write all of the vowels used in the dialect spoken in 19th century Utah. The vowel inventory has also been attributed to the fact that, unlike other American pioneers, the Mormon pioneers were from New England as opposed to the American South. As such, many of the vowels in the Deseret alphabet have since merged in the modern era: they are no longer distinguished in many dialects of English.

For those exhibiting both mergers, both would be written 𐐿𐐪𐐻.

Versions 
There have been several published versions of the alphabet. Most versions (including the versions used in The Deseret First Book, The Deseret Second Book, The Deseret News and The Book of Mormon) had only 38 letters, but some versions contained two ligatures, 𐐧 (ew) and 𐐦 (oi). In place of 𐐮𐐭 or 𐐷𐐭, 𐑏 was to be used; in place of 𐐱𐐮, 𐑎.

In the 23 February 1859 edition of the Deseret News, the editors announced their approval of the two new letters and eventual intention to use them in the newsletter. However, due to the hot metal typesetting technology in use at the time, casting the new letters for use would have been a considerable expense, so it was never realized.

Representation of  

The Deseret alphabet does not have a distinct symbol for the mid central vowel ([], "schwa"). The lack of a schwa has been cited as the biggest "phonological flaw" in the alphabet.

Because of the lack of a schwa, the author must write the sound that would be used if the word was stressed. For example, the word enough is commonly pronounced , but when it is stressed (as in a declaration of irritation) it is pronounced . The Deseret spelling of the word, 𐐨𐑌𐐲𐑁, reflects that stressed pronunciation. If [] does not have an inherent stressed value in a word, as is often the case before , then it is written as 𐐲.

Marion J. Shelton, an early Mormon missionary, proposed the addition of a new glyph to represent the schwa, a simple vertical line of the same height as other Deseret characters with a similar appearance to the Turkish dotless i (ı). The addition of this glyph did not catch on among his contemporaries, however, and no document outside of ones penned by Shelton makes use of it. Shelton used the new glyph in an 1860 letter to Brigham Young reporting on a recently completed mission to the Paiute people.

Syllabic values
Each letter in the Deseret alphabet has a name, and when a letter is written on its own it has the value of that name. This allows some short words to be written with a single letter, and is called a letter's "syllabic value". The consonants with syllabic values are 𐐶 (woo), 𐐷 (yee), 𐐸 (ha),  𐐹 (pee), 𐐺 (be/bee), 𐐻 (tee/tea), 𐐽 (qi), 𐐾 (gee), 𐑀 (gay), and 𐑄 (the/thee).

Syllabic values do not apply within words, although this was formerly the case. This contextual value switching was soon done away with, so in later documents, while "bee" is written 𐐺, "bees" is written 𐐺𐐨𐑆.

In 40-letter versions of the alphabet which include the letter 𐐧 (ew) which represents , the letter 𐐧 when standing alone can be used to represent the word "you".

Examples 
 – Hello, how are you? – I'm doing great, thanks! – It was nice seeing you, but I've got to run! Take care!
 – 𐐐𐐯𐑊𐐬, 𐐸𐐵 𐐪𐑉 𐑏? – 𐐌'𐑋 𐐼𐐭𐐮𐑍 𐑀𐑉𐐩𐐻, 𐑃𐐰𐑍𐐿𐑅! – 𐐆𐐻 𐐶𐐲𐑆 𐑌𐐴𐑅 𐑅𐐨𐐨𐑍 𐑏, 𐐺𐐲𐐻 𐐌'𐑂 𐑀𐐪𐐻 𐐻𐐭 𐑉𐐲𐑌! 𐐓𐐩𐐿 𐐿𐐩𐑉!
 Oil floats on water, but mercury sinks below both. This is due to their relative densities.
 𐐦𐑊 𐑁𐑊𐐬𐐻𐑅 𐐪𐑌 𐐶𐐫𐐻𐐲𐑉, 𐐺𐐲𐐻 𐑋𐐲𐑉𐐿𐐷𐐲𐑉𐐨 𐑅𐐮𐑍𐐿𐑅 𐐺𐐮𐑊𐐬 𐐺𐐬𐑃. 𐐜𐐮𐑅 𐐮𐑆 𐐼𐐭 𐐻𐐭 𐑄𐐯𐑉 𐑉𐐯𐑊𐐲𐐻𐐮𐑂 𐐼𐐯𐑌𐑅𐐮𐐻𐐨𐑆.
The first lesson in the Deseret First Book reads simply:

In the Deseret Second Book, there is a version of Twinkle, Twinkle, Little Star on page 19:

Handwriting 
There were two main handwritten forms of the Deseret alphabet: a cursive version and a printed version. Over the lifetime of the alphabet, the cursive form fell out of favor among most users of the alphabet and by 1856 no more cursive documents exist. Its impact on the glyphs can however still be plainly seen in the loops of certain characters such as 𐑅, 𐑀 and 𐐼. The earliest surviving versions of the Deseret alphabet, from 1853 (one year before its January 1854 approval), have printed and cursive forms side-by-side, suggesting that a cursive form was part of the plan from the very beginning.

Cursive 

The cursive form of the Deseret alphabet was mainly used by two people: George D. Watt, and James Henry Martineau. Watt, a stenographer, recorded several bishops meetings and wrote other personal documents in this cursive style. A chart of the cursive form appears below. The blue glyphs represent how to write each character, while the top row of printed glyphs shows the corresponding Unicode reference glyph.

The cursive style has many unorthodox characteristics uncommon to alphabetic writing systems. Vowels can be dropped if the writer is in a hurry and feels the word is obvious as in an abjad, letters can be written above or below the base line depending on what precedes them, and 𐐮 is placed on letters after they are already written as in an abugida. Furthermore, unlike the typeset alphabet, the cursive alphabet has no letter case. These characteristics could have arisen because Watt was a local expert in Pitman shorthand, which is written in a similar way.

The table below shows some examples of how the cursive form is written. Dropped vowels are marked in parenthesis.

Block letters 
George D. Watt found his own alphabet cumbersome to write and abandoned it. As he wrote to Brigham Young on 21 August 1854:
His new alphabet closely resembled an 1853 publication of Isaac Pitman, containing only 33 letters. However, at this point, Young was still enamored with the original Deseret alphabet, and so he rejected the proposal and Watt continued to publicly promote the alphabet as part of his job despite his reservations.

After 1855, no more cursive documents appear, and all surviving journals are written in block letters. Marion J. Shelton, an early Mormon missionary who wrote a dictionary of the Hopi language in the alphabet, was a "typical" 40-letter Deseret writer, and his style of writing is shown below.

Design criticism 

The Deseret alphabet was purposely designed so as to not have ascenders and descenders. This was envisioned as a practical benefit for the alphabet in an era of metal type: after many uses, the edges of type sorts become dull, and narrow ascenders and descenders are most prone to this effect.

While well intentioned, this lack has been described as a "catastrophic" mistake that makes type look "monotonous" and makes all words look alike. Some have drawn comparisons between the alphabet and the Old Turkic script, saying that writing in the new alphabet could be mistaken from afar as a Turkish tax list.

The Mormon pioneers were apparently aware of the problems caused by its monotony:

Other criticism of the design was harsher still. In an 18 December 1857 editorial in the Boston Globe, the alphabet was described as being "so arranged and named as to cause the greatest possible annoyance to outsiders" and the design of the letters as "incomprehensible as [...] the hieroglyphics of the [...] Egyptians." On 4 March 1872, The New York Times called the alphabet "rude, awkward and cumbersome."

Some modern computer fonts and printed books have attempted to correct this perceived fault: in the books in John Jenkins' Deseret Alphabet Classics series, the font used adds a descender to 𐑉 and 𐐻 and an ascender to 𐐼 and 𐑇 among other tweaks.

Other motives 
Officially, the Deseret alphabet was created to simplify the spelling of English words for the benefit of children and English as a second language learners. Some of the alphabet's contemporaries, however, posited an alternative motivation for its development: increasing the isolation of the early Mormons.

To keep outsiders from reading Mormon secrets (largely dismissed) 
The charge that the Deseret alphabet's main purpose was to keep outsiders ("gentiles" in LDS terminology) in the dark was brought almost immediately, as evidenced by the following 1858 Lyttelton Times reprint of an unnamed "New York newspaper":
Having obtained a copy of the Deseret News in 1859, the Richmond Dispatch disparaged it on April 25, writing "The Deseret News is filled with a lot of hieroglyphs. It seems to be [an alphabet] which the Mormons alone are to be taught."

Modern historians, however, doubt the veracity of this theory. For one thing, notes Kenneth R. Beesley, the Deseret News and every book published in the alphabet prominently features the key to the alphabet, and anyone without a key could have gotten a copy of A Journey to Great-Salt-Lake City, or traveled to Salt Lake City themselves and bought one. Contemporary scholars Richard F. Burton and Jules Remy also dismissed the secrecy argument, in 1860 and 1855 respectively.

To keep Mormons from reading outside literature 
With the impending completion of the Transcontinental Railroad, the Mormon pioneers would have easy, cheap access to publications from the east, including yellowbacks, penny dreadfuls, pulp magazines, and other often scandalous or dirty publications that were rising to prominence in the 19th century. Indeed, in an article about the benefits of the alphabet, the Deseret News proudly wrote:
In another article, the Deseret News cited an example of the kind of literature Mormons would benefit from not being able to read: The Police Gazette. Historians A. J. Simmonds and Roby Wentz contend that while this may have been a tertiary goal of the alphabet, a sort of "happy accident", the main purpose of it was simple orthographic reform. Simmonds notes that the teaching of English to foreigners was not a mere hypothetical to mask isolationist tendencies: 35% of the Utah Territory's population at the time was Scandinavian, with German, Italian and Welsh speaking people also making up a considerable percentage of inhabitants; therefore, communication between the recently baptized and the community was a real problem.

Encodings 

The Deseret alphabet (U+10400–U+1044F) was added to the Unicode Standard in March 2001 with the release of version 3.1, after a request by John H. Jenkins of Apple, making it one of the first scripts to be added outside of the Basic Multilingual Plane. The letters 𐐧 (ew) and 𐐦 (oi) were added to the Unicode Standard in April 2003 with the release of version 4.0.

According to Kenneth R. Beesley, who submitted the proposal to expand the encoding, "Unicode fonts based on the current heterogeneous collection of glyphs will be useless for any practical typesetting of 40-letter Deseret Alphabet documents." This is because the Unicode Consortium chose to use glyphs from 1855 as the reference glyphs, while by 1859 those glyphs were already outmoded and replaced with newer glyphs. Beesley thus recommends using LaTeX along with his Metafont  font to typeset Deseret text, but fonts which use the alternate glyphs for the two codepoints in question would also work for transcription of 40-letter Deseret texts written during and after 1859.

On 25 February 2016, the Library of Congress approved an ALA-LC romanization for the Deseret alphabet. The table can be used to display approximations of titles in non-Latin scripts using the Latin alphabet for use in library catalogs that do not support non-Latin alphabets.

See also

 International Phonetic Alphabet
 State of Deseret

References

Further reading 

 Bigler, David. 1998. Forgotten kingdom: the Mormon theocracy in the American West, 1847–1896.  Spokane: Arthur Clark
 Ivins, Stanley S. 1947. The Deseret Alphabet. Utah Humanities Review 1:223-39.
 Lynott, Patricia A. 1999. "Communicating Insularity: The Deseret Alphabet of Nineteenth-Century Mormon Education." American Educational History Journal 26 (1):20–26.
 Thompson, Roger. 1982. Language planning in frontier America: The case of the Deseret Alphabet. Language Problems and Language Planning 6:45–62.
 Wintersteen, Larry Ray. 1970. A History of the Deseret Alphabet . MA thesis, Brigham Young University.
 .

External links

 The Mormon Alphabet Experiment | "From the Stacks" at New-York Historical Society
 M. Scott Reynolds' Deseret alphabet portal
 Joshua Erickson's Deseret alphabet pages
 The Deseret Alphabet at Omniglot
 Deseret Alphabet Translator—. Converts standard orthography to Deseret alphabet and vice versa
 Deseret to IPA converter—Converts Deseret input to the International Phonetic Alphabet

1854 establishments in Utah Territory
1854 introductions
Alphabets
Auxiliary and educational artificial scripts
English orthography
English spelling reform
History of the Church of Jesus Christ of Latter-day Saints
Phonetic alphabets
University of Utah
Writing systems introduced in the 19th century
Writing systems of the Americas